Todd Boatwright (born September 5, 1965, in Dallas, Texas) is Spectrum  News 1 Texas's weekend morning news anchor.

Career
Boatwright graduated from the University of North Texas with a degree in Radio, Television, and Film, and during his studies he was an intern at KDFW in Dallas. His first appearance on TV as an anchor and reporter was at KAVU in Victoria, Texas. After 15 months he moved to KETK-TV in Tyler, where he spent five years as the Longview bureau chief and reporter. In 2000, Boatwright reported on the Republican and Democratic Conventions.

References

American television news anchors
1965 births
Living people
University of North Texas alumni
People from Dallas
People from Austin, Texas
Journalists from Texas
20th-century American journalists
American male journalists